West Clinton is an unincorporated community in Helt Township, Vermillion County, in the U.S. state of Indiana.

History
West Clinton was platted in 1911. The community lies west of Clinton, hence the name.

Geography

References

Unincorporated communities in Vermillion County, Indiana
Unincorporated communities in Indiana